Letters to Lost Loves is the first studio album by the Tyson Motsenbocker. Tooth & Nail Records released the album on March 4, 2016.

Critical reception

Awarding the album five stars for CCM Magazine, Matt Conner states, "It plays like a score to a movie you’ve never seen but would love to watch. A true gem for Tooth & Nail." Christopher Smith, rating the album three and a half stars at Jesus Freak Hideout, writes, "Letters To Lost Loves is a promising start for a talented artist." Giving the album four stars from Jesus Freak Hideout, Michael Weaver says, "Tyson still provides a solid musical product here."

Track listing

References

2016 debut albums
Tooth & Nail Records albums